Joel C. Dobris (born  1940) is a Professor of Law at the UC Davis School of Law (King Hall).  Dobris is one of the most cited legal academics in the country in the area of the law of Wills, Trusts, and Estates.  His book, Estates and Trusts, is a widely used textbook at American law schools.

He received a B.A. in English from Yale College in 1963 and an LL.B. from the University of Minnesota Law School in 1966.

References

Yale College alumni
University of Minnesota Law School alumni
UC Davis School of Law faculty
California lawyers
1940s births
Living people
American legal scholars